Crepidium uncatum is a member of the family Orchidaceae, endemic to the Philippines.

References

uncatum
Orchids of the Philippines